David Michael Navarro (born June 7, 1967) is an American guitarist. He is best known as a member of the rock band Jane's Addiction, with whom he has recorded four studio albums. Between 1993 and 1998, Navarro was the guitarist of the Red Hot Chili Peppers, recording one studio album, One Hot Minute (1995), before departing. He has also released one solo album, Trust No One (2001). Navarro has also been a member of Jane's Addiction-related bands Deconstruction and the Panic Channel. 

AllMusic's Greg Prato described Navarro as "one of alternative rock's first true guitar heroes", with an eclectic playing style that merges heavy metal, psychedelia, and modern rock.
"He's one of the last great guitarists," said Henry Rollins, former Black Flag singer, who saw him playing with Jane's Addiction.

Navarro was also the host and one of the judges on Ink Master, an American tattoo competition reality series that aired on Paramount Network (formerly called Spike) from 2012 to 2020.

Personal life

Early life and family
David Michael Navarro was born on June 7, 1967, in Santa Monica, California, the son of James Raul Navarro and Constance Colleen Hopkins. His paternal grandparents were Mexican immigrants. His grandfather Gabriel Navarro was close friends with Mexican silent film actor Ramón Novarro, who allegedly adopted his artistic surname. He attended Notre Dame High School in Sherman Oaks, California, where he was a member of the marching band with future Jane's Addiction bandmate Stephen Perkins.

Navarro's mother and aunt were murdered by her ex-boyfriend, John (Dean) Riccardi, in March 1983. Riccardi was arrested in 1991, thanks to a viewer tip after Riccardi was featured on the television series America's Most Wanted. During his appearance on America's Most Wanted in 2004, Navarro stated that he was supposed to visit and stay with his mother on the night of her murder but at the last minute went to stay with his father. In 2015, Navarro released the documentary Mourning Son, which details his mother's murder and his spiral into drug addiction, as well as the pain he has had to overcome in the years since her death.

Marriages
Navarro has been married three times: celebrity makeup artist Tania Goddard-Saylor (1990–1992, divorced), Rhian Gittins (1994, annulled), and model and actress Carmen Electra (2003–2007, divorced). As of May 2022, Navarro is engaged to Vanessa DuBasso

Politics 
Navarro was a performer at the Republican National Convention in 2012 in which Mitt Romney was nominated for president. In 2016, he described his views in a Tweet as "Libertarian".
Navarro had stated he was supporting Marianne Williamson as a candidate for the 2020 Democratic presidential primaries. He subsequently expressed support for Tulsi Gabbard, including having her on his show.

Career

Early influence
He said that "When I was very young, it was always Jimi Hendrix." He was also fascinated by Yngwie Malmsteen for a brief period. Navarro also stated that he learned a lot from Robert Smith of the Cure and Daniel Ash of Bauhaus. He also said: "And I have always loved all the different guitarists that have been in Siouxsie and the Banshees". He considers that "The great innovators, for me, are still Hendrix and [Jimmy] Page." Van Halen's debut album was another reason why he learned to play guitar.

1986–1993
Navarro joined the band Jane's Addiction in 1986 as the lead guitarist after he was recommended to vocalist Perry Farrell by drummer Stephen Perkins, who was a childhood friend of Navarro's. The band became successful and was popular in the alternative-rock music scene. Over the next five years, Jane's Addiction released three albums, Jane's Addiction (1987), Nothing's Shocking (1988) and Ritual de lo Habitual (1990). Personal tensions, however, led to their breakup in 1991. The Lollapalooza festival was created by Farrell as a farewell tour for Jane's Addiction.

After the departure of Guns N' Roses' original rhythm guitarist Izzy Stradlin in August 1991, Navarro was the first choice of lead singer Axl Rose to replace Stradlin; despite four attempts to have him come in and play with Slash, he never showed up. However, he later went on to play on the 1999 Guns N' Roses song "Oh My God", which was featured on the End of Days soundtrack. In 1993, Navarro formed Deconstruction with Jane's Addiction's Eric Avery on vocals and bass and Michael Murphy on drums. The band put out one self-titled album in 1994. Rick Rubin was involved in the production and Butthole Surfers singer Gibby Haynes makes a guest appearance. They did not tour due to Avery's exhaustion after Jane's Addiction.

1993–1998
Navarro joined Red Hot Chili Peppers in September 1993. His first large-scale performance with the band was at Woodstock '94. The only album on which Navarro played with Red Hot Chili Peppers, One Hot Minute, was released in 1995. The band later recorded and released a cover of the Ohio Players' song "Love Rollercoaster" for the Beavis and Butthead Do America soundtrack, which was released as a single. The band also contributed the John Lennon song "I Found Out" to the Working Class Hero: A Tribute to John Lennon album, as well as the One Hot Minute outtake "Melancholy Mechanics" to the Twister soundtrack.

In 1995, Navarro played guitar for Alanis Morissette's track "You Oughta Know" on one of the 1990s' most successful albums, Jagged Little Pill.

Despite mixed reviews, One Hot Minute sold over eight million copies worldwide and produced three hit singles. Navarro toured with Jane's Addiction for their 1997 Relapse tour with Flea on bass. After two years of touring on and off with Red Hot Chili Peppers, and his subsequent heroin relapse, Navarro was fired in 1998 over "creative differences".

Navarro also remixed Janet Jackson's "What'll I Do" for her Janet Remixed album during this time.

2001–2005
The summer 2001 album Trust No One (Capitol Records) marked his solo debut. The band assembled for the accompanying US tour consisted of Navarro, guitarist Dave Kushner, bassist Miiko Watanabe and drummer Angel Roché, Jr.. In 2002, Jane's Addiction reformed with bass player Chris Chaney and started work on a new album. The band entered the studio with veteran rock producer Bob Ezrin, resulting in the album Strays and the Lollapalooza 2003 tour in support of the album. In 2002, Michael Jackson performed at the Apollo Theater, and Navarro played guitar for his hit song "Black or White". During this time Navarro also made a cameo in Mariah Carey's "Bringin' On the Heartbreak" music video.

Navarro began working with Camp Freddy during this time. In 2003, he and his fiancée, Carmen Electra, agreed to have their wedding preparations filmed for an MTV show titled Til Death Do Us Part; Camp Freddy played at the reception. The show was a success and was released on DVD in the fall of 2005. Navarro's book, Don't Try This at Home, was published on October 5, 2004 by ReganBooks, and quickly became a Los Angeles Times bestseller.

Navarro appeared in two tournaments on Celebrity Poker Showdown in 2004. In the third tournament of the series, he won his qualifying game and appeared in the championship round. In the fourth series, he appeared only in a qualifying round.

2006 to present 
Navarro co-hosted with Brooke Burke, two seasons of the Mark Burnett television series: Rock Star: INXS and Rock Star: Supernova. Navarro and his band, the Panic Channel, released their album One, in August 2006. They toured with Rock Star Supernova (the band formed from the series) in January/February 2007. During this period, Navarro had his own internet radio station. He soon broadened his creativity with an internet talk show called: Dave Navarro's SPREAD TV, which was streamed on ManiaTV.com and was made available for download on iTunes. The show highlighted avant-garde subjects, artistry, and the human condition. Videos from the series are also available on Navarro's YouTube channel.

In 2007, Navarro also teamed with Teravision to direct his first adult movie, Broken starring Sasha Grey, in the first of a planned series of celebrity-directed adult movies. This effort won "Best High End All-Sex Release" at the 2008 AVN Awards. Navarro appeared in Season 1 and Season 2 of Z Rock with Brooklyn-based band ZO2 on IFC. In 2008, he recorded additional riffs for the version of "Black Cat" performed on Janet Jackson's Rock Witchu Tour, appearing on screens during the rendition.

Jane's Addiction reunited once more in 2008 with all of the original members. The tumultuous band's reunion influenced NME magazine to choose Jane's Addiction as the recipient of their "Godlike Genius Award for Services to Music". Soon after performing together for the first time in 17 years at the NME Award ceremony in Los Angeles, the band was contacted by Trent Reznor. Reznor began working with Jane's Addiction in his studio; they recorded and released two songs ("Chip Away" and "Whores") online on the NINJA 2009 Tour Sampler. Both songs were previously released on their self-titled 1987 live album. This time together in the studio led directly to the pairing of Nine Inch Nails and Jane's Addiction for a worldwide tour in 2009. The tour was branded the NIN/JA tour by fans.

During August 2009, Navarro toured southern California as part of the Billy Corgan-led band Spirits in the Sky.

In 2010, he posed naked for PETA's anti-fur campaign, "Ink Not Mink". He stripped down again for the group's anti animal-testing campaign in 2013.

In 2011, Navarro appeared as the "Director" of a Rock and Roll Fantasy Camp, playing a complicated passage for a "camper" to emulate, in a commercial for Citibank.

Navarro featured on the track "Girls/Fast Cars" on the album The Wombats Proudly Present: This Modern Glitch by indie rock band the Wombats.

The Red Hot Chili Peppers were named 2012 inductees to the Rock and Roll Hall of Fame. Despite being in the band for five years and playing on one album, Navarro was not inducted. When the announcement was made of the induction, Navarro said he was happy for the band but later said he had no plans to attend the ceremony, which was held in April 2012. Anthony Kiedis was asked why Navarro was not included in the induction and he responded by saying "He's in this other band, which may in fact be inducted itself one day, called Jane's Addiction. I think that's the band closest to his heart, and that most represents his contribution to the world in terms of music. So maybe it makes more sense for him to be inducted one day as a member of Jane's Addiction." According to the Hall of Fame and the Chili Peppers' lawyer, it is the Hall of Fame's decision on which members are inducted. They eventually selected original members, current members and those who have appeared on multiple albums. Ex-Peppers guitarist Jack Sherman disagreed and felt that both he and Navarro were being treated unfairly by the band, and believed they did have a say in who was inducted. Drummer Chad Smith was the only band member to acknowledge both Navarro and Sherman (along with other former members) during his induction speech.

Navarro appeared in four episodes of the FX drama Sons of Anarchy in 2012 and appeared as a guest on an episode of Talking Dead. In February 2013, he had a guest role in Law and Order: SVU, playing a sound engineer. In January 2012, Navarro became host and judge on the Paramount show Ink Master.

On February 8, 2020, Navarro performed with Jane's Addiction at a memorial show for Andrew Burkle, son of billionaire Ronald Burkle who died in January 2020. Navarro was photographed for the first time in 23 years with his former Red Hot Chili Peppers bandmates, who also performed. John Frusciante, who replaced Navarro in the band back in 1998, performed briefly with Jane's Addiction marking the first time the two Chili Peppers guitarists have shared a stage together.

On December 20, 2021, Navarro and Billy Morrison held their third annual Above Ground benefit concert in Los Angeles. They were joined onstage by Anthony Kiedis for a performance of Lou Reed's "Walk on the Wild Side". This marked the first performance of Kiedis and Navarro together in 24 years since Navarro was fired from the Red Hot Chili Peppers.

Navarro sat out a joint tour between Jane's Addiction and the Smashing Pumpkins in 2022 due to long COVID; his place was filled by Queens of the Stone Age guitarist Troy Van Leeuwen for the duration of the tour. Navarro will again be absent from Jane's Addiction on their 2023 tour while still battling the effects of long COVID, and Josh Klinghoffer will play guitar in his place.

Equipment

During the first few years of Jane's Addiction, Dave played a black Gibson Les Paul. Around the time of the band's major label debut Nothing's Shocking in 1988, he played Ibanez RG series guitars, including one custom painted with the album cover art. He is seen in the film "Gift" and the "Stop" video playing a blue Ibanez RG, which suggests it was used in the recording of the album Ritual de lo Habitual. During the 1990 Ritual tour, he primarily played a custom-shaped single cutaway gold Ibanez.

Dave began using PRS Guitars on the Lollapalooza tour in 1991. His signature model PRS (White with Gold Hardware) is now his primary stage guitar. He has several models in his regular stage and studio rig, and was only the third PRS artist to have both a Maryland-made and SE version of their Signature Model.

He used a Parker Fly Deluxe for the Chili Peppers days during the live versions of "My Friends". He used it for its clean tones and its piezoelectric pickup that sounds similar to an acoustic guitar.

During this era, Dave used a Fender Stratocaster for the brighter blues and funk tones required for the Red Hot Chili Peppers catalog. He has several Stratocasters in his possession. He also had a Modulus Stratocaster-like guitar made for him.

Dave has also been seen playing Kramer Van Halen Signature Guitars, Fender Telecasters, Takamine Acoustic 12 strings, and even a Squier Hello Kitty Stratocaster given to him by Carmen.

Since late 2008, Dave has been seen both live and in studio using a custom white Ibanez RG, with a humbucker/single/single pickup layout, gold hardware, and a vintage style tremolo, essentially an Ibanez version of his PRS Guitars Signature Model.
Dave previously used a vintage Marshall JCM800, but now plays through two Marshall JCM900 amplifiers which are dubbed Tangerine and Peach. For large gigs he will also use a Marshall Mode 4 for clean tones. In the studio he is also commonly known to use a Vox AC30 for cleans and a Bogner Uberschall for dirty tones.

For effects, Dave prefers BOSS. He uses a BOSS Octave Pedal, two BOSS DD3 Digital Delays, a BOSS Turbo distortion for extra volume during soloing, a Dunlop Cry Baby Wah Pedal and several others.

Epiphone Guitars (a subsidiary of Gibson) released its Dave Navarro Artist Acoustic in July 2010. According to an interview with Navarro on Gibson.com, the new guitar is based upon the classic Gibson (and Epiphone) "Hummingbird" design, and has already been played by the guitarist in the studio while recording with Jane's Addiction. Named "Jane", the new guitar is black in color (as opposed to Navarro's usual white guitars), and sports a dead tree and crows on the pickguard, rather than the traditional Hummingbird and foliage images.

Discography

Solo discography

Albums

EPs 

 Rhimorse (1995)

Singles

With Jane's Addiction

With Deconstruction 
 Deconstruction (1994)

With Red Hot Chili Peppers 
 1995 One Hot Minute 
 1995 Working Class Hero: A Tribute to John Lennon ("I Found Out" only)
 1996 Beavis and Butt-head Do America ("Love Rollercoaster" only)
 2003 Greatest Hits (Red Hot Chili Peppers)  
 2011 Road Trippin' Through Time
 2012 Rock & Roll Hall of Fame Covers EP

Guest appearances 
With Janet Jackson
 1995 Janet Remixed – lead guitar and remix on "What'll I Do" (Dave Navarro Mix)
 2008 Rock Witchu Tour – lead guitar and video appearance on "Black Cat" (Live version)
With Nine Inch Nails
 1995 Further Down the Spiral – lead guitar on "Piggy (Nothing Can Stop Me Now)"
 2016 Not the Actual Events – lead guitar on "Burning Bright (Field on Fire)"

With Alanis Morissette
 1995 Jagged Little Pill – lead guitar on "You Oughta Know"

With Marilyn Manson
 1998 Mechanical Animals – guitar solo on "I Don't Like the Drugs (But the Drugs Like Me)"

With Guns N' Roses
 1999 End of Days OST – lead guitar on "Oh My God"

With Perry Farrell
 2001 Song Yet to Be Sung – guitar and percussion on "Song Yet to Be Sung"

With P.Diddy
 2001 The Saga Continues... – lead guitar on "Bad Boy for Life"

With Christina Aguilera
 2002 Stripped – lead guitar on "Fighter"

With Gene Simmons
 2004 "Asshole" – lead guitar on "Firestarter" (The Prodigy cover)

With Glenn Hughes
 2005 Soul Mover

With Tommy Lee
 2005 Tommyland: The Ride – guitar solo on "Tired"

With the Panic Channel
 2006 (ONe)

With Dead Celebrity Status
 2006 Blood Music – guitar solo on "We Fall, We Fall"

With Grey Daze
 2022 The Phoenix – guitar solo on "Holding You"

Filmography

References

External links

 
 PRS Guitars Dave Navarro Signature model

Living people
1967 births
American bloggers
American libertarians
American rock guitarists
American male guitarists
Capitol Records artists
Chicano rock musicians
Jane's Addiction members
Lead guitarists
American musicians of Mexican descent
Participants in American reality television series
Musicians from Santa Monica, California
Red Hot Chili Peppers members
Alternative metal guitarists
Notre Dame High School (Sherman Oaks, California) alumni
Critics of Christianity
Guitarists from California
20th-century American guitarists
21st-century American guitarists
The Panic Channel members
Deconstruction (band) members
American male bloggers
Hispanic and Latino American musicians